The women's doubles of the 2007 ECM Prague Open tournament was played on clay in Prague, Czech Republic.

Marion Bartoli and Shahar Pe'er were the defending champions, but neither of them chose to participate that year.

Seeds

Draw

Notes
The winners received $6,240 (per team) and 115 ranking points (as individuals).
The runners-up received $3,360 and 80 ranking points.
The last directly accepted team was Petra Cetkovská and Andrea Hlaváčková (combined ranking of 310th).
The player representative was Sandra Klösel.

External links
Draw

Prague
2007 - Women's Doubles
2007 in Czech women's sport